West Laurens High School is a public high school located in unincorporated Laurens County, Georgia, United States, near Dexter. The school is part of the Laurens County School District, which serves the county. The overall average on the report card for the school is 81.4898

Alumni
 Dustin Fowler, baseball player
 Anthony Johnson, Junior College National Wrestling Champion; former mixed martial artist in the Light Heavyweight Division of the UFC
 Demaryius Thomas, NFL wide receiver for the Denver Broncos

References

External links
 West Laurens High School
 Laurens County School District

Schools in Laurens County, Georgia
Public high schools in Georgia (U.S. state)
Georgia Accrediting Commission